Lingasamudram mandal is one of the 38 mandals in Nellore district of the Indian state of Andhra Pradesh. Its headquarters are located at Lingasamudram. The mandal is bounded by .This mandal is located at Kandukur revenue division.

Demographics 

 census, the mandal had a population of 38,094. The total population constitute, 13,114 males and 18,980 females —a sex ratio of 990 females per 1000 males. 8,365 children are in the age group of 0–6 years, of which 4,276 are boys and 4,089 are girls —a ratio of 956 per 1000. The average literacy rate stands at 76.11% with 51,318 literates.

Towns and villages 

The settlements in the mandal are listed below:

Note: CT-Census town

See also 
List of mandals in Andhra Pradesh

References

Mandals in Nellore district